I Care 4 U is a posthumous compilation album by American singer Aaliyah. It was released on December 10, 2002, by Blackground Records and Universal Records. Following Aaliyah's death on August 25, 2001, Blackground decided to release a posthumous record in collaboration with Universal Music Group. The album included some of Aaliyah's singles and previously unreleased recordings discarded from sessions for her eponymous third and final studio album (2001).

I Care 4 U received mixed reviews from critics, based on the assessment of the previously unreleased songs and the compilation's breadth in general. Commercially, the album was a success, debuting at number three on the US Billboard 200 and being certified platinum by the Recording Industry Association of America (RIAA). It also reached the top ten France, Germany, Switzerland, and the United Kingdom. The album produced four singles—"Miss You", "Don't Know What to Tell Ya", "I Care 4 U", and "Come Over"—and has sold over six million copies worldwide.

Background
Between October 2000 and February 2001, Aaliyah filmed her part in the vampire film Queen of the Damned (2002) in Melbourne, simultaneously recording what would become her eponymous third and final studio album. The album was released in July 2001 to widespread critical acclaim. It became a commercial success as well, debuting at number two on the US Billboard 200 and selling 187,000 copies in its first week; it marked the highest sales week of her career to that point.

On August 25, 2001, Aaliyah and eight others were killed in a plane crash in The Bahamas after filming the music video for the single "Rock the Boat". The pilot Luis Morales III was unlicensed at the time of the accident and had traces of cocaine and alcohol in his system. Aaliyah's family later filed a wrongful death lawsuit against Blackhawk International Airways, which was settled out of court. Following Aaliyah's death, Aaliyah reached the top of the Billboard 200, spending 69 weeks on the chart, and had sold 2.6 million copies in the United States by December 2009.

Recording and production
I Care 4 U features both album cuts and previously-unreleased tracks and demos, recorded between 1993 and March 2001. The title track was written by  Missy Elliott and Timbaland, who also produced the song, and was recorded at the Magic Mix Studios and Music Grinder Studios in Los Angeles in 2000. Aaliyah began to record the song for her second studio album One in a Million (1996), but it was completed after that album had finished post-production, thus she saved it for Aaliyah. Timbaland also wrote and produced "Don't Know What to Tell Ya", which was co-written by Static Major and recorded at the Manhattan Center Studios.

Originally crafted for Ginuwine's second studio album 100% Ginuwine (1999), "Miss You" was written by Ginuwine, Johntá Austin and Teddy Bishop, while being produced by Bishop. In 1999, while Aaliyah was recording her eponymous third studio album (2001) at the Manhattan Center Studios, she requested Austin and Bishop to play her a couple of tracks they had produced with other artists, including "Miss You", for which Ginuwine had already lent his vocals. Bishop later commented: "She was like, 'I want to cut this record' [...] She got on the phone, called him and said 'Hey I know you cut this record already, but I would love to cut it'." Ginuwine allowed her to cut her own version of it and the same night, Aaliyah re-recorded the whole song. Though she reportedly wanted to put the song out herself, her label Blackground Records felt the song was no "smash record", thus it was left unused until after her death.

"Come Over" was written by Johntá Austin, Bryan-Michael Cox, Kevin Hicks and Phalon "Jazze Pha" Alexander, while being produced by Cox, Hicks and Alexander. It was originally recorded for Aaliyah at the Sony Music Studios in New York City, but did not make the album's final cut. When the song was left unused, it was given to American duo Changing Faces, who included their version on their third studio album Visit Me (2000); however, Aaliyah's original version ended up being included on I Care 4 U. Altogether, Natalie Nichols from the Los Angeles Times categorized the albums material as a "minimalist blend of hip-hop, funk, soul and dance-music".

Release and promotion
I Care 4 U was released in the United States on December 10, 2002, by Blackground Records and Universal Records, with its CD+DVD limited edition being released simultaneously. Internationally, it was released in both editions in early 2003. Its title track received heavy airplay throughout 2002, which helped promote the album, as well as the digital release of the lead single "Miss You" in October 2002 prior to it being serviced to US radio the following month. Upon the album's release, it was announced that a portion of its proceeds would go to the Aaliyah Memorial Fund.

In August 2021, it was reported that the album and Aaliyah's other recorded work for Blackground (since rebranded as Blackground Records 2.0) would be re-released on physical, digital and, for the first time ever, streaming services, in a deal between the label and Empire Distribution, with I Care 4 U being reissued on October 8. The re-release was met with disdain from Aaliyah's estate, who issued a statement denouncing the "unscrupulous endeavor to release Aaliyah's music without any transparency or full accounting to the estate".

I Care 4 U had earlier been released digitally, without permission from Blackground Records, by Craze Productions, using a scan of the international edition cover instead of its digital printing master and without any additional metadata. A lawsuit against Craze Productions was filed by Reservoir Media Management, a marketing partner of Blackground Records at the time, and the jury agreed with them in September 2015. Even after the ruling and the official 2021 reissue, the illegal edition is still available on digital and streaming services.

Singles
"Miss You" was released as the album's lead single on October 28, 2002. It debuted at number 55 on the Billboard Hot 100 and went on to peak at number three. It was ranked eighth on the 2003 year-end Billboard Hot 100. Internationally, the song peaked at number eight in Germany and within the top twenty in Canada, Denmark, the Netherlands, and Switzerland. Its accompanying music video, directed by Darren Grant, featured appearances from various celebrities, including Missy Elliott, Lil' Kim, Tweet, Queen Latifah, Jaheim, Lyric, Lil' Jon, Eastside Boyz, Jamie Foxx, DMX, Quincy Jones, and Ananda Lewis.

"Don't Know What to Tell Ya" was released as the second single on February 11, 2003. As its release in the United States was limited, it failed to enter both Billboard Hot 100 and Hot R&B/Hip-Hop Songs. Internationally, it peaked at number 22 on the UK Singles Chart and number five on the UK R&B Chart.

"I Care 4 U", which was originally included on Aaliyah (2001), was released as the third single on April 8, 2003. The song had already peaked at number 16 on the Billboard Hot 100 and number three on the US Hot R&B/Hip-Hop Songs in 2002 as an "album cut" from Aaliyah despite not being released as a single.

"Come Over" was released as the fourth and final single on May 27, 2003. It peaked at number 32 on the Billboard Hot 100 and at number nine on the Hot R&B/Hip-Hop Songs.

Critical reception

I Care 4 U received mixed reviews from music critics. In a positive review for Entertainment Weekly, Craig Seymour said I Care 4 U showcased Aaliyah's "interpretive talent" and ability to inspire her songwriters, while Graham Smith from musicOMH deemed it "a fine introduction to a much missed artiste", particularly because of the six previously-unreleased songs. According to Vibe magazine's Jason King, the album compiled some of the most ambitious dance-pop of the previous ten years. Uncut said Aaliyah's "silvery and subtle reconfigurations of R&B" were showcased on the compiled singles, which AllMusic's John Bush felt reminded listeners of her vocal talent. Bush was also impressed by the previously-unreleased tracks, writing that they "provide an intriguing look at where Aaliyah may have taken her career had she lived". Robert Christgau was somewhat less enthusiastic, viewing I Care 4 U as an incomplete compilation whose inconsistent mix of career highlights was nonetheless rectified by the quality of the new tracks, particularly "Erica Kane". In The Village Voice, he wrote:

In a more critical review, Slant Magazines Sal Cinqeumani was not impressed by the new songs on what he said was "neither a posthumous album of all-new material nor a proper greatest hits package" but "a half-assed attempt at satiating the Aaliyah fan's need for both". Rolling Stone magazine's Arion Berger also felt the album's second half of newer songs was somewhat inferior to Timbaland's "impressive" productions on the first half, while Natalie Nichols of the Los Angeles Times panned the previously-unreleased songs as "merely soothing sonic wallpaper, with Aaliyah's pretty yet personality-free voice often treated like just another element in the mix". In The Rolling Stone Album Guide (2004), Keith Harris felt Aaliyah's catalogue warranted a more comprehensive compilation, although he believed the new songs proved she was maturing creatively before her death. Michael Paoletta from Billboard felt that in seven years, Aaliyah "had amassed an impressive track record" and that I Care 4 U showed Aaliyah's growth as an artist. He also mentioned that her "unrealized potential is particularly evident on recent tracks as "More Than a Woman" and the title track."

Accolades

|-
! scope="row"| 2003
| Billboard R&B/Hip-Hop Award
| Top R&B/Hip-Hop Single – Airplay
| rowspan="2"| "Miss You"
| 
| align="center"| 
|-
! scope="row"| 2003
| MTV Video Music Award
| Best R&B Video
| 
| align="center"| 
|}

Commercial performance
I Care 4 U debuted at number three on the US Billboard 200 chart with first-week sales of 279,500 copies sold, placing Aaliyah with her biggest first-week sales. On the Top R&B/Hip-Hop Albums chart the album debuted at number one where it charted at the top spot for 7 consecutive weeks. In its second week, the album plummeted to number 17 on the Billboard 200 and to number two on the Top R&B/Hip-Hop Albums, selling 222,000 copies. In its third week, the album rose to number ten on the Billboard 200 and to the top of Top R&B/Hip-Hop Albums, selling 188,000 copies. In its fourth week, the album rose to number nine on the Billboard 200, selling 80,000 copies, with total first-month sales of 770,000 copies. On January 15, 2003, I Care 4 U was certified platinum by the Recording Industry Association of America (RIAA) and as of September 27, 2005 has sold over 1.6 million copies in the United States.

Internationally, I Care 4 U was a commercial success as well, peaking within the top five in France, Germany, Switzerland and the United Kingdom. The album also peaked within the top ten in New Zealand and the Netherlands. In Europe, it peaked at number two on the European Top 100 Albums chart. The album has sold over six million copies worldwide.

Track listing

Notes
  signifies a remixer

Sample credits
"I Care 4 U" contains a sample from "(Too Little in Common to Be Lovers) Too Much Going to Say Goodbye" performed by The Newcomers and written by Carl Hampton and Homer Banks.
"More Than a Woman" contains a sample from the Arabic song "Alouli Ansa" by Syrian singer Mayada El Hennawy.
"Don't Know What to Tell Ya" contains a sample from the Arabic song "Batwannis Beek" performed by Algerian singer Warda Al-Jazairia.

Personnel
Credits are adapted from the liner notes of I Care 4 U.

 Aaliyah – lead vocals
 Johntá Austin – writing
 Homer Banks – writing
 Carlton Batts – mastering
 Teddy Bishop – production, writing
 Chandler Bridges – engineering assistance
 Bud'da – production
 Bryan-Michael Cox – production, writing
 Tom Coyne – mastering
 Jimmy Douglass – engineering, mixing, production
 Salah El Sharnouby – writing
 Missy Elliott – writing
 Ben Garrison – mixing
 Marvin Gaye – writing
 Ginuwine – writing
 Bernie Grundman – mastering
 Carl Hampton – writing
 Vincent Herbert – production
 Kevin Hicks – production, writing
 Ernie Isley – writing
 Marvin Isley – writing
 O'Kelly Isley, Jr. – writing
 Ronald Isley – writing
 Rudolph Isley – writing
 Chris Jasper – writing
 Jazze Pha – production, writing
 R. Kelly – instrumentation, mixing, production, writing
 Acar S. Key – engineering, mixing
 Craig King – production
 David LaChapelle – photography
 Mr. Lee – mixing
 Jonathan Mannion – photography
 Peter Mokran – engineering, mixing
 Rapture – instrumentation, production, writing
 Eric Seats – instrumentation, production, writing
 Static Major – production, writing
 Steve Penny – engineering assistance
 Tank – vocals
 Timbaland – mixing, production, writing, vocals
 Albert Watson – photography
 Michael Zainer – engineering assistance

Charts

Weekly charts

Year-end charts

Certifications

Release history

See also
 List of music released posthumously
 List of Billboard number-one R&B albums of 2002
 List of Billboard number-one R&B albums of 2003

Notes

References

Bibliography

External links
 

2002 greatest hits albums
Albums produced by Bryan-Michael Cox
Albums produced by Bud'da
Albums produced by Jazze Pha
Albums produced by R. Kelly
Albums produced by Timbaland
Universal Records compilation albums
Compilation albums published posthumously
Aaliyah compilation albums